Audrey Galy (born 30 May 1984) is a French rower. She won a gold medal at the 2004 World Rowing Championships on the Lake of Banyoles in Catalonia, Spain, in the women's four event.

References

External links

Living people
1984 births
French female rowers
World Rowing Championships medalists for France